2008 Iwate earthquake may refer to:

 2008 Iwate–Miyagi Nairiku earthquake on 14 June 2008, Mw 6.9
 July 2008 Iwate earthquake on 24 July 2008, Mw 6.8